The Toklat River is an  tributary of the Kantishna River in central Alaska in the United States It drains an area on the north slope of the Alaska Range on the south edge of the Tanana Valley southwest of Fairbanks. It issues from unnamed glaciers in the northern Alaska Range in Denali National Park and Preserve, northeast of Denali. It flows generally northwest through hilly country to the tundra to the north of the Alaska Range.

The river was described as the Toclat by Lt. H.T. Allen in 1885. Other names or variants include Tootl'ot Huno, Tootl'ot Huno' Hutl'ot, Tootl'ot No'  and Tutlut River.
Depth of 50 ft, width of 25 ft

Gallery

See also
List of rivers of Alaska

References

Alaska Range
Rivers of Denali Borough, Alaska
Rivers of Alaska
Denali National Park and Preserve
Rivers of Yukon–Koyukuk Census Area, Alaska
Rivers of Unorganized Borough, Alaska
Tanana Athabaskans